The Jim Brown Memorial Trophy Tournament is an annually awarded interstate ice hockey championship trophy in Australia. In 2014 it was for senior men aged 17 years and older with the condition that players of the Australian Ice Hockey League that are 20 years and younger must have played less than 6 games to remain eligible. The current trophy is in the form of a shield and is the third trophy to bear the Brown family name. The trophy is named after Scottish born James Archibald Brown. The Brown Trophy is competed for in a series of games between state representative teams in what is called The Brown Tournament.

Jim Brown Memorial Trophy Tournament
The 2014 national tournament was held from 2 October - 5 October and consisted of 4 teams, 3 teams represented a state while a 4th team were a combination of Western Australian and Queensland players called Barbarians. The Barbarians team was formed after Victoria pulled out of the tournament.

The tournament was held at Xtreme Ice Arena in Mirrabooka, Western Australia.

The schedule is as follows:

Standings
The standings for the 2014 Jim Brown Memorial Tournament:

Jim Brown Memorial Trophy Championship

Bronze Medal Game

Gold Medal Game

See also

Jim Brown Memorial Trophy
Ice Hockey Australia
New South Wales Ice Hockey Association
South Australia Ice Hockey Association
Western Australian Ice Hockey Association
Australian Ice Hockey League
Goodall Cup
Joan McKowen Memorial Trophy

References

External links
Ice Hockey Australia website

Australian Ice Hockey League
Australian Junior Ice Hockey League
Junior ice hockey leagues
junior
Youth ice hockey